Kupang is the provincial capital of East Nusa Tenggara, Indonesia.

Kupang may also refer to:

Places 
 Kampong Kupang, Brunei
 Kupang Regency, Indonesia
 Kupang, Kedah, Malaysia
 Kupang (state constituency), Malaysia
 Kupang LRT station, Singapore

Languages 
 Kupang language, one of the Malay trade and creole languages
 Kupang language, another name for Helong language

See also 
 Cupang, Muntinlupa